Samuel Dickenson (1733 – May 15, 1823) was an English clergyman and botanist.

He was educated at St John's College, Cambridge, where he was a contemporary of Erasmus Darwin. He succeeded his father John Dickenson as Rector of St. Mary's, Blymhill and remained in the position from 9 January 1777 until his death, aged 90, in 1823.

Dickenson contributed to various botanical and historical works and was tutor to Thomas Beddoes and Charles Darwin (uncle of the famous naturalist Charles Robert Darwin). He accompanied the 8 year old Darwin on an excursion to France, collecting plants, between October 1766 and March 1767.

The inscription on his memorial in St. Mary's reads:

Revd. Samuel Dickenson during 46 years Rector of this place his character was adorned with many virtues, his mind richly stored with learning divine and humane, he was remarkably upright in his dealings & strictly temperate in his mode of living, in simplicity & godly sincerity. He had his conversation in the world.

References

1733 births
1823 deaths
18th-century British botanists
Alumni of St John's College, Cambridge
18th-century English Anglican priests
19th-century English Anglican priests
19th-century British botanists